Chishchino is a rural locality (a village) in Nikolotorzhskoye Rural Settlement, Kirillovsky District, Vologda Oblast, Russia. The population was 12 as of 2002.

Geography 
Chishchino is located 41 km east of Kirillov (the district's administrative centre) by road. Rukino is the nearest rural locality.

References 

Rural localities in Kirillovsky District